Ralph Curtis "Curt" Schroder is former a member of the Pennsylvania House of Representatives. He represented the 155th district for nine terms. Schroder resigned on May 6, 2012.  Schroder was the Republican Chairman of the House Gaming Oversight Committee, and was also on the House Insurance Committee.

Career
Prior to his time in the House, Schroder was Prothonotary for Chester County from 1992 to 1994.

He began his involvement in public service in 1984, when he worked on constituent issues in the district office of Congressman Richard Schultze.  Schroder also served as Campaign Coordinator for Schulze for Congress in 1984.

Following his time with Congressman Schulze, Schroder worked for Nationwide Insurance as an associate agent before beginning his legal career with the firm of German, Gallagher and Murtagh from 1987 through 1991.

Following Jim Gerlach's July 14, 2009 announcement that he intended to vacate his Congressional seat to run for Governor of Pennsylvania, Schroder announced his candidacy for Congress. Schroder was considered the frontrunner for the GOP nomination, until Gerlach ended his candidacy for governor and announced he would be running for his Congressional seat once again. Gerlach's announcement prompted Schroder to end his bid for Congress.

Personal
Schroder is member of the Downingtown Lions Club.  He also serves on the Board of Directors of Brandywine Hospital, the Transportation Management Association of Chester County (TMACC), The Downingtown Senior Center, and the Brandywine YMCA.

Schroder is a 1979 graduate of Downingtown High School. He holds a bachelor's degree in political science from Indiana University of Pennsylvania.  He earned his Juris Doctor from Widener University School of Law in 1989.

He and his wife Deanna reside in Downingtown with their two children, Mark and Kristen.

References

External links
Representative Curt Schroder (R) official PA House website
State Representative Curt Schroder official caucus website
Curt Schroder for Congress official Congressional campaign website

Living people
Republican Party members of the Pennsylvania House of Representatives
1961 births
People from Coatesville, Pennsylvania
21st-century American politicians